The Mall at Partridge Creek is an open-air shopping mall in Clinton Township,  a suburb of Detroit, Michigan, United States. Under construction since 2005, the mall opened to the public on October 18, 2007, along with Parisian, which was the mall's only anchor at the time.

The Mall at Partridge Creek features free WiFi, pop jet fountains, a TV court and a 40' fireplace, and welcomes dogs and provides four dog comfort stations on site. The Mall at Partridge Creek was developed by the Taubman Corporation of Bloomfield Hills, Michigan. It is also the first mall to open in Macomb County since Lakeside Mall in 1976. The mall, owned by Starwood Capital Group, reported 2006 average sales per square foot of $539, well above the threshold for 'class A' mall properties. The state's first L.L.Bean opened in the center court between Pandora and Lush in 2016. There is a Nino Salvaggio grocery store in the outlet. The mall is anchored by L.L.Bean, H&M, Forever 21 and MJR Theatres, with two vacant anchor stores that once housed Nordstrom and Parisian, which was later rebranded to Carson's.

On April 18, 2008, Nordstrom opened to the public, making it the second department store to open at this mall.

On January 31, 2013, Parisian was renamed Carson's.

In August 2018, Carson's at the mall closed due to the chain’s liquidation. Their space now acts as a seasonal Halloween store, called Spirit Halloween, and a seasonal DIY gift wrap store, called Put A Bow On It Gift Wrap Center.

In June 2019, Nordstrom announced its closure at the mall, leaving the mall with no department store anchors. The store closed on September 13, 2019.

In February 11, 2020 Bobcat Bonnie's opened its fifth location in the former Max and Erma's towards the back of the mall.

About the mall
The mall features around 90 shops and restaurants. Tenants of the mall include L.L.Bean, Eddie Bauer, Apple Store, Starbucks, and Forever 21. The mall features a 14-screen MJR movie theater; a snow-melt system on the sidewalks; an outdoor play area.

The mall (and most of the stores) is billed as dog friendly, and the mall itself maintains a dog/owner code of conduct and a list of dog friendly stores.  It joins at least 38 other pet friendly malls in the United States.

References

External links
Official website

Shopping malls in Macomb County, Michigan
Shopping malls established in 2007
2007 establishments in Michigan